The 1971 NCAA University Division Tennis Championships were the 26th annual tournaments to determine the national champions of NCAA University Division men's singles, doubles, and team collegiate tennis in the United States.

Defending champions UCLA captured the team championship, the Bruins' tenth such title. UCLA finished eight points ahead of Trinity (TX) in the final team standings (35–27).

Host site
This year's tournaments were contested at the Courtney Tennis Center at the University of Notre Dame in South Bend, Indiana.

Team scoring
Until 1977, the men's team championship was determined by points awarded based on individual performances in the singles and doubles events.

References

External links
List of NCAA Men's Tennis Champions

NCAA Division I tennis championships
NCAA Division I Tennis Championships
NCAA Division I Tennis Championships
NCAA University Division Tennis Championships